The Platte River is a tributary of the Mississippi River in southwestern Wisconsin in the United States. Its watershed lies almost entirely within Grant County, with only a small portion in neighboring Iowa County, and its main tributary is the Little Platte River. It is about 47 mi (76 km) long.

The name Platte is derived from the French meaning "flat" or "shallow".

Course
The Platte River rises near Montfort and follows a generally southwesterly course through Grant County. It flows into the Mississippi River about 3 mi (5 km) southwest of Dickeyville, across from Mud Lake, Iowa. It is navigable from Ellenboro downstream to its confluence with the Mississippi. At one time, steamboats could navigate the lowest reaches of the river.

The Platte's largest tributary is the Little Platte River, which rises near Livingston. It joins the Platte River  to the southwest about 2 miles (3 km) west of Paris.

Geography

The Platte and Little Platte Rivers lie in exceptionally hilly terrain known as the Driftless Area. Many steep limestone bluffs dominate the landscape, often covered by white pine, which is uncharacteristic in the region. The vast majority of the area is covered in farmland and forest. The combination of the rugged terrain and extensive agriculture leads to significant runoff after storms, contributing to the many rapids along both rivers. One notable feature of the landscape is Platte Mound, which rises out of the relatively level surrounding terrain. This is the site of the world's largest letter M.

The rivers are part of the larger Grant-Platte Basin. The  of streams comprising the Platte River watershed cover . The watershed of the Little Platte River, which spills into adjoining Iowa and Lafayette Counties, was considered part of the Platte River watershed when surveyed by the Wisconsin DNR in 1979. Its  drain . All told, the combined watersheds drain , approximately 30% of Grant County.

Communities

The largest communities within the combined watersheds are Platteville, Dickeyville, Potosi, Montfort, and Livingston. Dickeyville sits on the border of the two watersheds, while Livingston marks the three-way divide between the two watersheds and that of the Upper West Branch Pecatonica River.

U.S. Route 61 crosses immediately downstream of the confluence of the Platte and Little Platte Rivers. The University of Wisconsin–Platteville is the only four-year university or college in the basin.

Recreation in the area includes boating and whitewater canoeing and kayaking. Local fishing is also popular, with the most common species being smallmouth bass, channel catfish, and northern pike. Public access to the Platte River is limited. A county canoe trail was proposed in 2001, and the city of Platteville offers several parks and trails.

Conservation

The regional importance of agriculture is reflected in the fact that cattle outnumber people in the area nearly 4 to 1. Farming's effect on natural resources in the watershed is described by the Wisconsin DNR: "Approximately 8.6 tons per acre per year of soil is lost from farm fields in the watershed. This watershed ranked second in the county as a 'priority area for erosion control.' DNR staff believe runoff from barnyards and feedlots, particularly in some headwaters areas, to be a severe problem in this watershed." According to a 2001 report, the main environmental issues are nonpoint source pollution in the forms of agricultural and urban runoff; soil erosion; mine waste; and a decline in the smallmouth bass population. The rivers empty into Pool 11 of the Mississippi River and are a major source of sediment. In addition, Grant County has many abandoned galena mines that are cited as sources of pollution.

In addition to the DNR, local citizen groups are addressing conservation issues. The Friends of the Platte River, Inc. bills itself as a "group that exists to serve as a forum to address issues affecting the Platte/Little Platte River watershed and to seek impartial solutions that restore, enhance, and protect this valuable resource." Friends of the Platte River website

See also
List of rivers of Wisconsin

References

Rivers of Wisconsin
Rivers of Grant County, Wisconsin
Tributaries of the Mississippi River